Charles Leiper Grigg (May 11, 1868 – April 16, 1940) was the inventor of 7 Up, originally known as Bib-Label Lithiated Lemon-Lime Soda. He invented the drink in October 1929. Grigg  became acquainted with the carbonated beverage business after moving to St. Louis, Missouri. Prior to inventing 7 Up, Grigg had created an orange soft drink named "Whistle" for the Vess Soda Company. It is still made and sold in St. Louis.

History 
Charles Leiper Grigg was born in 1868 in Prices Branch, Missouri to Charles L. S. Grigg (1822–1883) and Mary Elizabeth Leiper Grigg (1839–1890). At the age of 22, Grigg moved to St. Louis and began working in the advertising field in which he was introduced to the carbonated beverage business through the various agencies he was partnered.

By 1919, Charles Leiper Grigg was working as a salesman for a manufacturing company owned by Vess Jonea. It was there that Grigg invented and marketed his first soft drink called "Whistle". The success of the drink led to his promotion to the position of sales and marketing manager, however, eventually he and Voss came to loggerheads and Grigg left the company, leaving Whistle behind. He eventually settled at the Warner Jenkinson Company developing flavoring agents for soft drinks.

It was at this time that Grigg invented then his second soft drink, an orange-flavored beverage with 14% sugar named "Howdy". He partnered with financier Edmund G. Ridgway and lawyer Frank Gladney and formed the Howdy Company. Based on the quality of the product and supported by Ridgway's financing, the company grew quickly, adding bottling companies anxious to sell the drink.

Personal life
Grigg was married to Lucy E. Alexander Grigg. Lucy and Charles had several children.  He died on April 16, 1940, in St. Louis.

References

1868 births
1940 deaths
20th-century American inventors
Drink company founders
Keurig Dr Pepper people
People from St. Louis